Aïn Kechra is a town and commune in Skikda Province in north-eastern Algeria.

References

Communes of Skikda Province